The 2012 Kenyan Super Cup was a Kenyan football match that was played on 5 February 2012. It was contested by Tusker, the 2011 Kenyan Premier League winners, and Gor Mahia, the 2011 FKL Cup winners.

Tusker won 4-1 on penalties after the match ended 1-1 at full-time for their first title. The team's goalkeeper, Samuel Odhiambo, was awarded Man of the match after saving all but one of Gor Mahia's penalties during the shootout.

In addition to lifting the trophy, Tusker were awarded a KSh.750,000/= cheque prize while Gor Mahia took home KSh.500,000/=.

Match details

See also
 2011 Kenyan Super Cup
 2012 Kenyan Premier League
 FKF Cup

References

Super Cup
2012